Garshasp I ibn Muhammad (Persian: گرشاسپ بن محمد), mostly known as Garshasp I, was the Kakuyid emir of Hamadan, including Nihawand, Borujerd and western Jibal. He was the youngest son of Muhammad ibn Rustam Dushmanziyar, and was the vassal king of his brother Faramurz. In 1047, the Seljuqs defeated his forces and seized Hamadan, which forced him to flee to Buyid territory, where he became governor of Khuzistan. In ca. 1050, Garshasp sent an army to aid the Ghaznavid ruler Maw'dud in his wars with the Seljuqs. Garshasp later died in 1051/2 in Khuzestan.

References

Bibliography 
 Janine and Dominique Sourdel, Historical Dictionary of Islam, Éd. PUF, article Kakuyids, pp. 452–453. 
 
 
 

 

1050s deaths
11th-century monarchs in the Middle East
Date of birth unknown
Kakuyids
11th-century Iranian people
Buyid governors